This is a list of members of the Senate of Canada in the 31st Parliament of Canada.

The province of Quebec has 24 Senate divisions which are constitutionally mandated. In all other provinces, a Senate division is strictly an optional designation of the senator's own choosing, and has no real constitutional or legal standing. A senator who does not choose a special senate division is designated a senator for the province at large.

Names in bold indicate senators in the 21st Canadian Ministry.

List of senators

Senators at the beginning of the 31st Parliament

Senators appointed during the 31st Parliament

Left Senate during the 31st Parliament

Changes in party affiliation during the 31st Parliament
There were no changes in party affiliation during the 31st Parliament.

See also
List of current Canadian senators

References

31
Canadian parliaments
31st Canadian Parliament